Joe or Joseph Hernandez may refer to:

 Joe Hernandez (race caller), American race caller
 Joe Hernandez (American football), American football wide receiver
 Joseph Marion Hernández (1788–1857), American politician, plantation owner, and soldier
 Joseph Hernández Ochoa (1983/4–2010), Honduran journalist and television presenter